Anam was a band from the Celtic Nations playing modern folk in Celtic musical traditions from Ireland, England, Cornwall, Scotland and Nova Scotia. Formed by Brian Ó hEadhra in Dublin in 1992, they made their concert debut at the Festival Interceltique de Lorient in Lorient, Brittany, where they were awarded the "best band" trophy.

According to the website of founder Brian Ó hEadhra, Anam ceased operations in 2005.

Discography

Studio albums
 Anam (1994)
 Saoirse (1995)
 First Footing (1997)
 Riptide (1998)
 Tine Gheal / Bright Fire (2002)

Band members

Last members
Brian Ó hEadhra — vocals, guitar, bodhrán
Fiona Mackenzie — vocals, bodhrán
Gordon Gunn
Nuala Kennedy — flute, woodwind

Former members
Aimée Leonard — vocals, bodhrán
Anna-Wendy Stevenson — fiddle
Treasa Harkin — button accordion
Neil Davey — mandolin, bouzouki
Tim Edey — button accordion
Myles Farrell
Steve Larkin — fiddle
John Connolly button accordion
Tom Doorley flute
Stephen O'Kelly fiddle

Guests on recordings
Conrad Ivitsky — bass
James Mackintosh — drums
Calum Malcolm — keyboards

References

External links
allmusic.com biography covers up to 1998
Living Tradition review of Riptide
Brian Ó hEadhra and Fiona Mackenzie's website
 Anam Communications website

Celtic music groups
Irish folk musical groups
Musical groups from Dublin (city)